Musical repertoire is a collection of music pieces played by an individual musician or ensemble, composed for a particular instrument or group of instruments, voice, or choir, or from a particular period or area.

See also
Brass quintet repertoire
Classical guitar repertoire
Euphonium repertoire
Flute repertory
Organ repertoire
Piano trio repertoire
String instrument repertoire
Trumpet repertoire

Further reading
 Maurice Hinson, Wesley Roberts. Guide to the Pianist's Repertoire. Indiana University Press, 2013 (4th edition). 
 Maurice Hinson, Music for Piano and Orchestra: an annotated guide. Indiana University Press, 1981. 
 Calvert Johnson, East Asian Works for Harpsichord and Organ.

Musical terminology